Dorel Vișan (born 25 June 1937) is a Romanian actor. He has appeared in 65 films since 1974. He was nominated for the award of Best Actor at the 1988 European Film Awards.

He was born in Tăușeni, Cluj County. In 1965 he graduated from the Caragiale Academy of Theatrical Arts and Cinematography in Bucharest. After graduating, he was hired as an actor at the Cluj-Napoca National Theatre.

In May 2012 Vișan was awarded the National Order of Faithful Service, Knight rank by then-President Ion Iliescu.

Selected filmography 
 A Girl's Tears (1980)
 The Moromete Family (1987)
 Iacob (1988)
 The Oak (1992)
 The Snails' Senator (1995)
 Too Late (1996)
 Occident (2002)
 Sistemul nervos (2005) 
 Inimă de țigan (2007)
 Sacrificiul (2019)
 The Fox and The Hound 2- Amos Slade (Romanian voice)

References

External links 

1937 births
Living people
Romanian male film actors
People from Cluj County
Recipients of the National Order of Faithful Service
Caragiale National University of Theatre and Film alumni